De Kok or DeKok is a  Dutch occupational surname. It may refer to:

Frans de Kok (1924–2011), Dutch conductor
Frits de Kok (1882–1940), Dutch businessman, CEO of Royal Dutch Shell
Ingrid de Kok (born 1951), South African author
Irene de Kok (born 1963), Dutch judoka
 (born 1930), Dutch auxiliary bishop
Roger G. DeKok (1947–2003), United States Air Force commander
Roosmarijn de Kok (born 1994), Dutch fashion model
Winifred May de Kok (1893–1969), South African author

See also
De Cock
De Kock
Kok (surname)

Dutch-language surnames
Afrikaans-language surnames
Occupational surnames